Mumford  is a surname. Notable people with it include: 

 Alice Mumford (born 1965), artist
 Catherine Mumford (1829–1890), married name Catherine Booth, mother of The Salvation Army
 David Mumford (born 1937), British-American mathematician
 Eloise Mumford (born 1986), American actress
 Enid Mumford (1924–2006), British computer scientist known for her work on sociotechnical systems
 Ethel Mumford (1878?–1940), American writer
 George Mumford (died 1818), American politician
 Herbert Windsor Mumford I (1871–1938), American professor of agriculture 
 Jerri Mumford (1909–2002), Canadian servicewoman
 Lawrence Quincy Mumford (1903–1982), Librarian of Congress
 Lewis Mumford (1895–1990), American historian of cities and sociologist of technology
 Mary Mumford, 15th Lady Herries of Terregles (born 1940), daughter of the 16th Duke of Norfolk and a peeress in her own right
 Marcus Mumford (born 1987), English musician
 Mick Mumford, Australian military officer
 Quincy Mumford (born 1991), American singer-songwriter and guitarist
 Shane Mumford (born 1986), Australian footballer
 Stephen Mumford (born 1965), English philosopher
 Stephen Douglas Mumford (born 1942), American fertility and population growth expert
 Thad Mumford (1951–2018), American television writer and producer
 Thomas Mumford (1625–1692), progenitor of the Mumford family that left England and settled in Rhode Island
 Toni Mumford, Deputy Associate Administrator for Management for NASA’s Human Exploration and Operations (HEO) Mission Directorate
 William Bruce Mumford (died 1862), hanged for tearing down the US flag during the American Civil War

Fictional 
 Amazing Mumford, fictional character

it:Mumford
de:Mumford